The South African Railways Class 7E 4-8-0 of 1899 was a steam locomotive from the pre-Union era in the Cape of Good Hope.

In 1899, the New Cape Central Railway placed one Cape 7th Class  Mastodon type steam locomotive in service. Another three were commissioned in 1900, two more in 1903 and another one in 1904. In 1925, when the New Cape Central Railway was amalgamated into the South African Railways, these seven locomotives were renumbered and designated Class 7E.

New Cape Central Railway
The New Cape Central Railway (NCCR) was formed in January 1893, when it purchased all the assets of the bankrupted Cape Central Railway (CCR), who had constructed a railway line from Worcester via Robertson to Roodewal. In 1894, the NCCR began work to extend the line to Swellendam. From there, it continued via Heidelberg to Riversdale, which was reached on 3 December 1903.

The tracks were originally laid with  rail. When Voorbaai near Mosselbaai was reached in 1904,  from Worcester, it made the NCCR the longest private railway in South Africa.

Manufacturers

The original Cape 7th Class locomotive had been designed in 1892 by H.M. Beatty, at the time the Cape Government Railways Western System Locomotive Superintendent. The NCCR acquired its first seven Cape 7th Class locomotives piecemeal over a period of five years. The first locomotive, NCCR no. 1, was ordered from Neilson, Reid and Company in 1899, followed by three more from the same manufacturer in 1900, numbered in the range from 2 to 4.

Two more were ordered from Neilson, Reid in 1903, numbered 5 and 6, but since three Scottish locomotive builders (Dübs and Company, Neilson, Reid and Sharp, Stewart and Company) merged into the North British Locomotive Company (NBL) while the locomotives were being built, they were delivered as having been built by the newly established NBL at the Hyde Park works of the former Neilson, Reid.

The seventh 7th Class locomotive, no. 7, was acquired in 1904, also built by NBL. On the NBL works list, this locomotive is shown as actually having been built for Pauling and Company, the contractors who constructed the railway.

Class 7 sub-classes
In 1925, the NCCR was amalgamated into the South African Railways (SAR) and these seven 7th Class locomotives were taken onto the SAR roster, designated Class 7E and renumbered in the range from 1344 to 1350.

Other 7th Class locomotives which had come onto the SAR roster from the Colonial railways in the Southern African region in 1912, namely the Cape Government Railways (CGR), Central South African Railways (CSAR), Natal Government Railways (NGR) and Rhodesia Railways (RR), as well as more 7th Class locomotives which were acquired by the NCCR in 1913, were grouped into six different sub-classes by the SAR, becoming SAR Classes 7, 7A to 7D and 7F.

Modifications
During the 1930s, many of the Class 7 family of locomotives were equipped with superheating and piston valves. On the Class 7B and Class 7C, this conversion was sometimes indicated with an "S" suffix to the class letter on the locomotive number plates, but on the rest of the Class 7 family this distinction was not applied consistently. The superheated versions could be identified by the position of the chimney on the smokebox, the chimney having been displaced forward to provide space behind it in the smokebox for the superheater header.

Service
In SAR service, the Class 7 family served on every system in the country. They remained in branch line service, particularly at Tarkastad and Ladysmith and also on the Touws River-Ladismith branchline, where three Classes 7 and 7A and one Class 7E were on strength in January 1956.

By April 1962, two Class 7Es, numbers 1347 and 1348, were still shedded at Touws River to work the Ladismith branch. The Class 7Es were long-lived and these last two engines of the class were withdrawn from service in 1965.

Works numbers
The Class 7E builders, years built, works numbers and renumbering are listed in the table.

References

1500
1500
4-8-0 locomotives
2D locomotives
Neilson Reid locomotives
NBL locomotives
Cape gauge railway locomotives
Railway locomotives introduced in 1899
1899 in South Africa
Scrapped locomotives